Nerijus Barasa (born 1 June 1978) is a Lithuanian former professional footballer. He played as a right-back or defensive midfielder.

Career
Barasa started his career with FBK Kaunas in 1994 before joining Atlantas Klaipėda the following season. After a year in Latvia with Baltika Liepāja, he returned to Lithuania with his family, then FBK Kaunas came in for him.

Kaunas beckoned for Barasa in 2001, where he spent the following five seasons; four in the Russian Premier League with FC Krylia Sovetov Samara and FC Alania Vladikavkaz and one in the Russian First Division with FC Lada Togliatti. During this period he was called up to the Lithuanian national team, earning his first cap in 2001.

At the end of the 2005 season, Barasa moved to Scotland, signing for FBK Kaunas, then being immediately loaned to Heart of Midlothian. He joined the Tynecastle side on 13 January 2006 and spent a total of 16 months with the Edinburgh club before moving back to Kaunas.

In October 2006, Barasa was at the centre of controversy when he and compatriot Saulius Mikoliūnas were booed by Hearts fans for perceived poor form in a game against Rangers. This prompted Hearts' Sporting Director Alex Kozlovski to suggest that the supporters had ulterior motives for booing them, expressly their nationality. This claim was contested by fans representative groups and Kozlovski later apologised and retracted it.

Barasa missed half of the 2006–07 season due to injury and left Hearts in the summer of 2007, before also rescinding his contract with Kaunas. After that he retired in order to pursue business interests in Samara, Russia, where he lives with his wife. His last game was against Celtic in the Scottish Premier League on 14 January 2007.

International goals
Scores and results list Lithuania's goal tally first.

Honours
National Team
 Baltic Cup
 2005

References

External links

Hearts appearances at londonhearts.com

1978 births
Living people
Lithuanian footballers
Lithuania international footballers
Lithuanian expatriate footballers
FBK Kaunas footballers
FC Spartak Vladikavkaz players
PFC Krylia Sovetov Samara players
Heart of Midlothian F.C. players
Russian Premier League players
Scottish Premier League players
Expatriate footballers in Scotland
Expatriate footballers in Russia
FC Lada-Tolyatti players
Barasa
FK Kareda Kaunas players
Association football fullbacks
Association football midfielders